The president of Finland is Finland's head of state. Under the Constitution of Finland, executive power is vested in the president and the government, with the president possessing limited powers. Since 1994 no president may be elected for more than two consecutive terms. Presidents used to be elected indirectly, by an electoral college or by Parliament, but since 1994 the president has been elected directly by the people for a term of six years. The president must be a native-born Finnish citizen. The office was established by the Constitution Act of 1919. The current office-holder is Sauli Niinistö.

List of presidents

See also
2018 Finnish presidential election
President of Finland
List of presidents of Finland by time in office
First Ladies and Gentlemen of Finland
List of monarchs of Finland
Prime Minister of Finland
List of prime ministers of Finland
Politics of Finland
Parliament of Finland
Government of Finland
Council of State
Elections in Finland
Political parties in Finland
Lists of incumbents

External links
Official site
The Constitution of Finland

Finland

Presidentsi